The Edmonton Riverboat, formerly known as the Edmonton Queen, is a riverboat on the North Saskatchewan River in Edmonton, Alberta, Canada. The riverboat originally started to sail on the river under the name Edmonton Queen in 1995 and has become a unique Edmonton attraction. The Edmonton Riverboat is 52 metres long and configured to carry 399 passengers as of 2020. The Edmonton Riverboat primary operates during the summer months as the cold weather, variable river levels and the North Saskatchewan River is often iced-over throughout the winter.

History
On 2 April 1992, Edmonton Mayor Jan Reimer would announce a CA$3.4-million venture partially funded by the federal and provincial government to build a dock for the proposed Edmonton Riverboat. Edmonton builder Scott Steel would construct the riverboat within the city, but would refuse to release the vessel, claiming he was owed $1.35-million.  The Riverboat was a lifelong dream of Edmonton businessmen Ray Collins who formed the North Saskatchewan Riverboat Company and prepared the boat. The North Saskatchewan Riverboat Company would fail before launching the Edmonton Queen, and the riverboat was subsequently sold to the development corporation Carrington Properties for CA$500,000 in early 1995. The Edmonton Queen would eventually be launched on the North Saskatchewan River on 4 May 1995. 

In April 2016, the boat was sold in auction for $553,000 and underwent renovations, upgrades, and a change in name to Edmonton Riverboat.

The Edmonton Riverboat has had a number of grounding and weather incidents throughout its history. In July 2019, the boat became lodged on a sandbar. The 300 passengers on board were rescued by the Edmonton Fire Department. In April 2020, the boat was damaged after its hull was punctured by one of the underwater concrete pilings at dock due to rapid water level fluctuations from the spring thaw.
As of June 2020 the riverboat is dry-docked in Whitemud Park for repairs.

As of July 2022, the Edmonton Riverboat is back in operation after repairs and upgrades were completed.

References

External links

 

1995 ships
Tourist attractions in Edmonton
1995 establishments in Alberta
Ferries of Alberta